Glycyrrhiza is a genus of about 20 accepted species in the legume family (Fabaceae), with a subcosmopolitan distribution in Asia, Australia, Europe, and the Americas.

The genus is best known for liquorice (British English; licorice in American English), G. glabra, a species native to Eurasia and North Africa, from which most confectionery liquorice is produced.

Species
Species include:
Glycyrrhiza acanthocarpa
Glycyrrhiza aspera
Glycyrrhiza astragalina
Glycyrrhiza bucharica
Glycyrrhiza echinata
Glycyrrhiza eglandulosa
Glycyrrhiza foetida
Glycyrrhiza foetidissima
Glycyrrhiza glabra – liquorice, licorice
Glycyrrhiza gontscharovii
Glycyrrhiza iconica
Glycyrrhiza inflata
Glycyrrhiza korshinskyi
Glycyrrhiza lepidota – American licorice
Glycyrrhiza pallidiflora
Glycyrrhiza squamulosa
Glycyrrhiza triphylla
Glycyrrhiza uralensis
Glycyrrhiza yunnanensis

References

External links 
Jepson Manual Treatment
USDA Plants Profile: North American Species

 
Faboideae
Plants used in traditional Chinese medicine
Fabaceae genera